Drass may refer to

Places
Drass, Ladakh; a town in India
Drass river, Drass valley; a river in India
Drass Field at Scott D. Miller Stadium, Wesley College, Delaware, USA

Other uses
Drass (company), an Italian submarine and swimmer delivery vehicle manufacturer
Mike Drass (1961–2018), American football coach

See also

 
 Dras (disambiguation)